Frøbjerg Bavnehøj is  above sealevel and is the highest natural point on the island of Funen.

Notes 

Hills of Denmark
Assens Municipality